Negar Khan (born 18 July 1984; also credited as Nigar Khan) is an Iranian-born Norwegian actress. She is best known for her Bollywood item songs and film work.

Personal life
Khan is fluent in the Persian, Azeri, Norwegian, English and Urdu languages. Khan has a bachelor's degree in Marketing & Advertising and two master's degree in international business and film & television.

She married Sahil Khan on September 21, 2004, but divorced in July 2005. In 2009, she had a new romance with someone from India while keeping a low profile.

Career
Khan gained fame when she appeared in the music video of a remix of the classic Indian Hindi movie song "Chadti Jawani Meri Chaal Mastani". She was a contestant in the Norwegian version of the Paradise Hotel reality show, where she was accused of having multiple plastic surgeries. She claimed that she has not undergone any surgery.

Filmography

Controversies
Khan allegedly posed topless for the Norwegian men's magazine VI Menn in 2004. She denied this and said that the pictures had been graphically manipulated.

She was deported from India to Norway in February 2005 for allegedly providing false documents to procure her work visa. She had been working while on tourist visa. However, she and Sahil Khan claimed that she had married him and hence was eligible to become an Indian national.

References

External links

 

1984 births
Living people
Iranian emigrants to Norway
Norwegian expatriates in Australia
Western Sydney University alumni
Norwegian female models
Norwegian television actresses
Norwegian film actresses
Actresses in Hindi cinema
Norwegian expatriates in India
Iranian expatriates in India
People deported from India
People from Tabriz